Defending champion Joachim Gérard defeated Gordon Reid in the final, 4–6, 6–4, 6–4 to win the men's wheelchair tennis title at the 2016 Wheelchair Tennis Masters.

Seeds

  Stéphane Houdet (semifinals, fourth place)
  Gordon Reid (final)
  Joachim Gérard (champion)
  Gustavo Fernández (round robin)
  Nicolas Peifer (round robin)
  Stefan Olsson (semifinals, third place)
  Alfie Hewett (round robin)
  Maikel Scheffers (round robin)

Draw

Finals

Group A

Group B

References

External links

Men's singles draw

Masters, 2016